Sully Diaz (born July 12, 1960; New York City) is a Puerto Rican actress and singer. Sully's career started in Puerto Rican television with her first starring role as Coralito in the "novela" called Coralito. Sully was invited to star in various soap operas in Puerto Rico, Venezuela and Argentina.

Sully later returned to New York to study at the Actors Studio, Hebert Berghoff Studio and Ann Reinken Steps Studio.

In February 2012, Diaz was featured in the Spanish-language production of The Vagina Monologues, a play written by Eve Ensler, an American feminist who fights against gender violence worldwide. It has been translated into 49 languages and performed in over 120 countries. The 2012 cast also included Ivy Queen, Eileen Navarro, Lourdes De Jesús, Roxana Laborde, Yasmin Pietri, and sexologist, Carmita Laboy. This version was presented in Orlando, Florida.

Filmography

References

External links

Sully Diaz on TV.com

1960 births
Living people
Actresses from New York City
American women singers
American film actresses
American people of Puerto Rican descent
American soap opera actresses
American stage actresses
American television actresses
Hispanic and Latino American actresses
Spanish-language singers of the United States